Mark Ruiz (born April 9, 1979 in Río Piedras, Puerto Rico), is an Olympic diver from Puerto Rico.  Ruiz represented the United States in the 2000 Olympic Games and the 2004 Olympic Games.

Childhood
Ruiz took up diving at the age of 9. Upon a coach's suggestion, he moved to the U.S. at 12 to take advantage of the better training system.  During the spring nationals in 1999, he swept all three events (10-meter platform, 3-meter springboard and the non-Olympic event of 1-meter springboard), becoming the first diver since Greg Louganis in 1988 to accomplish this feat.
Ruiz is a graduate of Dr. Phillips High School in Orlando, Florida.  He was a member of the swimming and diving team and was the individual state champion for diving all four years he competed.

Competition
Mark's first attempt at the Olympics happened at the 1996 Trials. Ruiz also competes in synchronized diving (springboard and platform), which will have medal events for the first time in Sydney. Ruiz, a four-time national champion in the platform, has already qualified in the platform and 3-meter springboard. He and partner Rio Ramirez finished fourth in the 3-meter springboard at the 2000 World Cup. Mark retired (temporarily) after the 2004 Olympics in Greece.

Career
After his temporary retirement from competition, Ruiz taught diving clinics at the YMCA Aquatic Center. In 2010 Mark's former team, Team Orlando Diving (TOD) affiliated with the YMCA of Central Florida and became YCF Diving.  Mark Ruiz was named head coach and continues in this position today.

Achievements
2004  Olympic Team
2000  Olympic Team
2000  Olympic Team Trials, platform, 3-meter springboard, 1st
2000  National Indoor Championships, platform, 3-meter springboard, 1st
2000  National Indoor Championships, synchronized, platform, 1st
2000  World Cup, platform, 5th; 3-meter springboard, 7th
1999  Summer National Championships, synchronized, 3-meter springboard, 1st, platform, 2nd
1999  Summer National Championships, platform, 3- and 1-meter springboard, 1st
1999  Pan American Games, 3-meter springboard, 1st, platform, 5th
1999  World Cup, platform, 3rd
1999  Spring National Championships, synchronized, platform, 1st; 3-meter springboard, 3rd
1999  Spring National Championships, platform, 3- and 1-meter springboard, 1st
1998  Summer National Championships, synchronized, platform, 1st
1998  Summer National Championships, platform, 1-meter springboard, 1st; 3-meter springboard, 2nd
1998  Goodwill Games, 3-meter springboard, 10th; platform, 6th
1997  World Cup, platform, 5th

References

External links
Olympic Trial Photos
Mark Ruiz Bio - YCF Diving
Mark Ruiz Diving Camps

1979 births
Living people
Olympic divers of the United States
Puerto Rican male swimmers
Puerto Rican male divers
People from Río Piedras, Puerto Rico
Divers at the 2000 Summer Olympics
Divers at the 2004 Summer Olympics
American male divers
Pan American Games gold medalists for Puerto Rico
Pan American Games bronze medalists for the United States
Pan American Games medalists in diving
Dr. Phillips High School alumni
Divers at the 2003 Pan American Games
Divers at the 1999 Pan American Games
Competitors at the 1998 Goodwill Games
Medalists at the 1999 Pan American Games